Princess in the Palace is a Philippine television drama comedy series broadcast by GMA Network. Directed by Mike Tuviera, it stars Ryzza Mae Dizon, Aiza Seguerra and Eula Valdez. It premiered on September 21, 2015 on the network's afternoon line up replacing The Ryzza Mae Show. The series concluded on June 10, 2016 with a total of 187 episodes. It was replaced by Calle Siete in its timeslot.

Premise
Princess Cruz, is found following an accident and adopted by Leonora Clarissa Jacinto, the President of the Philippines.

Cast and characters

Lead cast
 Ryzza Mae Dizon as Princess Cruz / Princess Jacinto
 Aiza Seguerra as Josephine "Joey" David
 Eula Valdez as Leonora Clarissa "Leona" Jacinto-Gonzaga

Supporting cast
 Christian Vasquez as Oliver Gonzaga
 Allen Dizon az Alejandro 'Lejan' Dominguez
 Marc Abaya as Rafael Jacinto
 Ciara Sotto as Daphne Jacinto
 Ces Quesada as Nanay Luz
 Boots Anson-Roa as Victorina Jacinto
 Kitkat as Portia
 Rocky Salumbides as Samuel
 Miggy Jimenez as Joaquin Jacinto
 Lianne Valentin as Karen
 Hailey Lim as Tara
 Joey Paras as Georgina Veloso
 Vincent de Jesus as Kwini 
 Dante Rivero as Thomas "Tomas" Cruz
 Lito Legaspi as Manuel Gonzaga

Recurring cast
 Neil Perez as Timoteo delos Santos
 Kiko Estrada as Ikot Castro
 Andrea del Rosario as Diana Marquez 
 Gabby Eigenmann as Renato
 Lui Manansala as Lola Senen
 Patani Daño as Lily
 Rodjun Cruz as Kenneth 
 Valeen Montenegro as Gwen Dizon
 Nadine Samonte as Judy Cruz
 Maine Mendoza as Elizabeth "Elize" Ricardo
 Chanda Romero as Pilar Buenaventura
 Afi Africa as Tweety

Guest cast
 Mona Louise Rey as Clara
 Yassi Pressman as Perla 
 Rhen Escaño as young Leonora
 Mosang as Jacqueline Flores Katigbak-Vanderbilt
 Luigi Fernando as Senator Ramos
 Andrea Sigrid as Karen's teacher
 Chinggoy Alonzo as Senator Carlos Jacinto
 Jenny Miller as Ms. Cordova
 Kate Lapuz as Valerie Tengco
 Gilleth Sandico as Elsie
 Toby Alejar as Miguel
 Kiel Rodriguez as Francis Bandilla
 Janvier Daily as Ato

Ratings
According to AGB Nielsen Philippines' Mega Manila household television ratings, the pilot episode of Princess in the Palace earned an 18.9% rating. While the final episode scored a 12.4% rating.

Accolades

References

External links
 

2015 Philippine television series debuts
2016 Philippine television series endings
Filipino-language television shows
GMA Network drama series
Philippine political television series
Television series by TAPE Inc.
Television shows set in Manila